The third season of Esta historia me suena (shown on screen as Esta historia me suena: Vol. 3) aired from 5 August 2020 to 25 September 2020 on Las Estrellas. The season is produced by Genoveva Martínez and Televisa. The season consists of thirty-eight one-hour episodes, the first eight were originally produced for the second season. The entire season is available via streaming on Blim TV.

This is the final season to be presented by María José.

Notable guest stars 

 Erika Buenfil
 Sylvia Pasquel
 Isaura Espinoza
 Alfredo Gatica
 Ricardo Franco
 Alejandro Tommasi
 Mónica Sánchez Navarro
 Martha Julia
 Alejandro Ibarra
 Gloria Sierra
 Lisset
 Isaura Espinoza
 Eugenio Cobo
 Cecilia Gabriela
 Verónica Langer
 Queta Lavat
 Lisardo
 Diego de Erice
 Maribel Fernández
 Ramiro Fumazoni
 Raquel Olmedo
 Malillany Marín
 Marcelo Córdoba
 Anna Ciocchetti
 Lisette Morelos
 Cynthia Klitbo
 Alejandro Ávila

Episodes

Notes

References 

2020 Mexican television seasons